The Airain or Airin is a  long river in the Cher department in central France. Its source is at Nérondes. It flows generally west, with a U shape.

Communes along its course
This list is ordered from source to mouth: Nérondes, Tendron, Bengy-sur-Craon, Flavigny, Cornusse, Ourouer-les-Bourdelins, Charly, Lugny-Bourbonnais, Osmery, Bussy, Vornay, Dun-sur-Auron, Crosses, Savigny-en-Septaine,

References

Rivers of France
Rivers of Cher (department)
Rivers of Centre-Val de Loire